Thomas McCoy Wells (1841 – February 5, 1901) was an Irish born Union Army soldier and officer during the American Civil War. He received the Medal of Honor for gallantry during the Battle of Cedar Creek fought near Middletown, Virginia on October 19, 1864. The battle was the decisive engagement of Major General Philip Sheridan's Valley Campaigns of 1864 and was the largest battle fought in the Shenandoah Valley.

Wells enlisted in the Army from De Kalb, New York in November 1861, and was assigned to the 6th New York Cavalry Regiment. He was commissioned as a second lieutenant in January 1865, and promoted to first lieutenant the following May. Wells was transferred to the 2nd Provisional NY Cavalry in June 1865, and mustered out with this regiment the following August.

Medal of Honor citation
"The President of the United States of America, in the name of Congress, takes pleasure in presenting the Medal of Honor to Chief Bugler Thomas McCoy Wells, United States Army, for extraordinary heroism on 19 October 1864, while serving with 6th New York Cavalry, in action at Cedar Creek, Virginia, for capture of colors of 44th Georgia Infantry (Confederate States of America)."

See also

List of Medal of Honor recipients
List of American Civil War Medal of Honor recipients: T-Z

References

External links
Military Times Hall of Valor
Findagrave entry

1841 births
1901 deaths
Irish emigrants to the United States (before 1923)
People of New York (state) in the American Civil War
Union Army soldiers
Union Army officers
United States Army Medal of Honor recipients
Irish-born Medal of Honor recipients
Irish soldiers in the United States Army
American Civil War recipients of the Medal of Honor
People from De Kalb, New York